Milan Kňažko (born 28 August 1945) is a Slovak actor and politician.  He was one of the leading personalities of the Public against Violence movement in November 1989 and one of the most popular faces of the Velvet Revolution in Slovakia.

Acting
Kňažko starred in Devět kruhů pekla, which was screened in the Un Certain Regard section at the 1989 Cannes Film Festival.

He had a key supporting role in the 2007 horror film Hostel: Part II, where he portrayed Sasha, the leader and manager of the Elite Hunting Club.

From 2016–2019 he starred in a Czech translation of the play Shylock by Canadian playwright Mark Leiren-Young at Divadlo Na Jezerce in Prague. The play was filmed and shown as a television special on Czech TV.

References

1945 births
Living people
Foreign Ministers of Slovakia
People from Veľký Krtíš District
Public Against Violence politicians
People's Party – Movement for a Democratic Slovakia politicians
Slovak Democratic and Christian Union – Democratic Party politicians
Slovak male film actors
Government ministers of Slovakia
Candidates for President of Slovakia
Members of the National Council (Slovakia) 1992-1994
Members of the National Council (Slovakia) 1994-1998
Recipients of the Thalia Award